Baar is the Estonian version of the reality competition television series The Bar. The show aired for two seasons between 2004 and 2005 on Kanal 2.

It led to the establishment of several celebrities, including two later politicians – Paavo Pärn and Talis Kitsing from Estonian Reform Party. Another politician, Sirje Kingsepp from Estonian Left Party participated in the show.

Setting 
The program was set in a pub (previously known as R.I.F.F., referred to in the show as "Baar"), and in an apartment in the town centre of Tallinn. The participants' task was to run the pub and live together in the apartment.

Season 1
Start Date: 16 October 2004
End Date: 31 December 2004
Duration: 77 days
Contestants:
The Finalists: Annika (The Winner) & Paavo (Runner-up)
Evicted Contestants: Ingrid, Kaisa, Kimon, Kristjan, Lagle, Liis, Liisi, Maarit, Madis, Sirje, Talis & Tarmo

Contestants

Nominations

Season 2
Start Date: 3 October 2005
End Date: 31 December 2005
Duration: 90 days
Contestants:
The Finalists: Alari (The Winner) & Karin (Runner-up)
Evicted Contestants: Anton, Kertu, Maarius, Raune, Siret, Talis, Tauri, Telle, Tiina, Toñis & Vova

Contestants

Nominations

References 

 SL Õhtuleht 2 September 2004: Uues reality-show’s «Baar» lõõmavad intriigid reaalajas by Marilin Vikat
 Trend24, 9 July 2008: Talis Kitsing nõuab Keskerakonnalt preemiat!
 Õhtuleht 29 September 2008: Reality-karussell: "See on pöörane – maha hüpata ei saa, aga süda läheb pahaks!" by Katrin Pauts

2000s Estonian television series
2004 Estonian television series debuts
2005 Estonian television series endings
Estonian reality television series
2000s reality television series
Kanal 2 original programming